Abdullah el-Erian (Damanhur, March 21, 1920 — Leiden, December 12, 1981) was an Egyptian international lawyer, diplomat, and judge. He served as Permanent Representative of Egypt to the United Nations in Geneva from 1968 to 1979. He was a judge at the International Court of Justice (ICJ) from 1979 until his death in 1981. He was a member of the Institut de Droit International.

He died of a heart attack in 1981. He was succeeded at the ICJ by Mohammed Bedjaoui.

References 

International Court of Justice judges
International law scholars

1920 births
1981 deaths